yr.no is a website and a mobile app for weather forecasting and dissemination of other types of meteorological information hosted by the Norwegian Broadcasting Corporation in collaboration with the Norwegian Meteorological Institute. The website was launched in September 2007.

The word yr means drizzle in Norwegian.

Information sources 
In addition to data from the Norwegian Meteorological Institute, yr.no uses open data from various collaborators such as
 European Organisation for the Exploitation of Meteorological Satellites
 GeoNames
 The Norwegian Polar Institute

It also collects information from different types of private weather stations.

References

Norwegian news websites
Meteorological data and networks
2007 establishments in Norway
Internet properties established in 2007
NRK
Norwegian Meteorological Institute